Katherine McHale (born June 27, 1955) is a former Democratic member of the Pennsylvania House of Representatives.

References

Democratic Party members of the Pennsylvania House of Representatives
Women state legislators in Pennsylvania
Living people
1955 births
21st-century American women